Gods and Generals is a historical first-person shooter video game developed by American studio Activision Value and published by Activision. The game is based on the film of the same name. The player commands a soldier in the midst of the American Civil War, choosing either to side with the Union or the Confederacy, and plays alongside hordes of other soldiers. The player is tasked with various missions such as raids and reconnaissance, in addition to leading a full army company. In large-scale battles ranging from the Second Battle of Bull Run, the battle of Chancellorsville and the battle of Fredericksburg, players are equipped with muskets, revolvers, sabers and other weapons. This nine-part campaign game uses various scenes from the film.

Gods and Generals was released on March 1, 2003 as a PC Windows exclusive, and was critically panned by the media and gaming community.

Critical reception
Gods and Generals was panned by critics. It has an aggregate score of 19 based on Metacritic. GameSpot named it the worst game of 2003, describing Gods and Generals as "a shoddy afterthought of an unrelated marketing campaign."

References

2003 video games
Activision games
American Civil War video games
First-person shooters
Single-player video games
Video games based on films
Video games based on adaptations
Video games set in Virginia
Windows games
Windows-only games
Video games developed in the United States